Barry Causby (born 9 September 1948) is an Australian cricketer. He played thirty-two first-class matches for South Australia between 1973 and 1981.

See also
 List of South Australian representative cricketers

References

External links
 

1948 births
Living people
Australian cricketers
South Australia cricketers
Cricketers from Adelaide